Thora Janette Scott (born 14 December 1938) is an English retired actress.

Life and career
Scott was born on 14 December 1938 in Morecambe, Lancashire, England. She is the daughter of actors Jimmy Scott and Thora Hird and began her acting career as a child actress known as Janette Scott. Scott was briefly (along with Jennifer Gay) one of the so-called "Children's Announcers" providing continuity links for the BBC's children's TV programmes from the Lime Grove Studios in the early 1950s.

She became a popular leading lady; one of her better known roles as April Smith in the film School for Scoundrels (1960), based on the "one-upmanship" books by Stephen Potter, in which Ian Carmichael and Terry-Thomas competed for her attention. Some scenes for School for Scoundrels were shot at a private members club before its current incarnation as a hotel. The hotel hosted a screening in 2016 with Janette Scott attending and answering questions about filming School for Scoundrels.

Scott's highest profile as a leading lady in British films was from the late 1950s to the mid-1960s, having over a dozen leading roles during this period. She was the female lead opposite some major stars of the time, including Terry-Thomas, Ian Carmichael, Ronald Lewis, Ian Hendry and George Chakiris. She proved adept in a wide variety of genres, including comedy, romantic drama, sci-fi thriller, and period adventure. She gave up her career upon marrying second husband Mel Tormé.

She is best known to American audiences for her role as the parson's wife in the film The Devil's Disciple (1959), starring Burt Lancaster, Kirk Douglas and Laurence Olivier.

She is referenced by name in the song "Science Fiction/Double Feature", the opening number from The Rocky Horror Show and its film version The Rocky Horror Picture Show (performed over the opening credits), for her participation in the 1962 film The Day of the Triffids.

Scott wrote her autobiography Act One at the age of 14.

Marriages
She has been married three times:
Jackie Rae (27 June 1959 – 1965), divorced
Mel Tormé (20 May 1966 – 1977), divorced; 2 children, including son James Tormé
William Rademaekers (1981 deceased 2018)

Filmography

Film

Television

References

External links 

1938 births
Living people
20th-century English actresses
21st-century English actresses
Actresses from Lancashire
English child actresses
English film actresses
English television actresses
People from Morecambe